You Won't Get What You Want is the fourth studio album by American rock band Daughters. It was released on October 26, 2018, through Ipecac Recordings, and is the band's only album since their 2013 reformation.

The album was released to universal critical acclaim, with many critics naming it one of the best albums of 2018. It marks a significant departure from the band's earlier style, moving away from mathcore towards a more industrial and noise rock influenced sound.

Promotion 
On July 13, 2018, Daughters released a single, "Satan in the Wait" from their upcoming album, the single and album are being released through Ipecac Records. On August 17, 2018, Daughters announced the title of the album, and released their second single from the album titled "The Reason They Hate Me", it was described as "noisier and more abrasive" than the last single. The band also announced more tour dates alongside the announcement. On October 2, 2018, Daughters released the third single from the album "Long Road, No Turns", the song was described by Rolling Stone as "another unique beast: off-kilter rhythms pierce through a seething veneer of distortion and Marshall, his voice sounding crystal clear, sings about making mistakes and coming undone." On January 14, 2019, the band released their first-ever music video for the song "Less Sex". The video was directed by the band's former guitarist Jeremy Wabiszczewicz.

Critical reception

You Won't Get What You Want was met with widespread critical acclaim. On Metacritic, which assigns a normalized rating out of 100 to reviews from mainstream critics, the album received an average score of 87, based on 11 reviews, which indicates "universal acclaim". The album was included on numerous end-of-year lists as one of the best albums of 2018. Pitchfork wrote, "Similar to their Providence art-metal contemporaries in The Body, Daughters' accessibility is directly proportional to their uncompromising compositional choices—hypnotic dissonance, martial drums cranked to incapacitating volumes, scathing vocal repetition, all rendered through impossibly vivid production. This is not music interesting [sic] in growing on you: it consumes and dominates." PopMatters called it "the perfect return for Daughters. While aspects of the band's creative vision have been altered and their sound has further evolved, the core elements remain intact. The asphyxiating sound has been augmented with the inclusion of longer, heavier sludge influenced moments. The tension the band build is further explored through different means." The album also received a "perfect 10" from Anthony Fantano of The Needle Drop, one of only seven albums to have ever received such a score as of August 2021. In 2021, Jacek Szafranowicz described the album as "the most surprising record of 2018", noting that "Less Sex" is a "gorgeous 21th century blues".

Accolades

Track listing

Personnel 
Credits for You Won't Get What You Want adapted from liner notes

Daughters
 Alexis S.F. Marshall – vocals, lyrics
 Jon Syverson – drums
 Nicolas Andrew Sadler – guitar, production
 Samuel Walker – bass guitar

Additional personnel
 Seth Manchester – recording, production
 Heba Kadry – mastering
 Jesse Draxler – artwork
 Shawn Vesinaw – layout

References

2018 albums
Daughters (band) albums
Ipecac Recordings albums
No wave albums
Experimental rock albums by American artists
Post-punk albums by American artists
Noise rock albums by American artists
Industrial rock albums